Qarah Cheh Robat (also Romanized as Qarah Cheh Robāţ; also known as Qarajeh Robāţ and Qareh Jarābād) is a village in Darband Rural District, Jolgeh Sankhvast District, Jajrom County, North Khorasan Province, Iran. At the 2006 census, its population was 354, in 76 families.

References 

Populated places in Jajrom County